Ubaldina may refer to:

Ubaldina Valoyes (born 1982), Colombian weightlifter
42614 Ubaldina, a main-belt minor planet